Kunowo may refer to the following places:
Kunowo, Gostyń County in Greater Poland Voivodeship (west-central Poland)
Kunowo, Piła County in Greater Poland Voivodeship (west-central Poland)
Kunowo, Kuyavian-Pomeranian Voivodeship (north-central Poland)
Kunowo, Słupca County in Greater Poland Voivodeship (west-central Poland)
Kunowo, Szamotuły County in Greater Poland Voivodeship (west-central Poland)
Kunowo, Gryfino County in West Pomeranian Voivodeship (north-west Poland)
Kunowo, Stargard County in West Pomeranian Voivodeship (north-west Poland)
Kunowo, Świdwin County in West Pomeranian Voivodeship (north-west Poland)